The Skirmish at Acworth was a battle that was fought between the Union army and the Confederate army in Cobb County, Georgia on June 3, 1864. The result of the Battle is inconclusive.

References
 https://books.google.com/books?id=OBkNAQAAMAAJ&pg=PA697&lpg=PA697&dq=skirmish+at+ackworth&source=bl&ots=6rejkxBubf&sig=dONPFGaVG8b3x54ND0QpCIbU_kc&hl=en&sa=X&ei=6ymfVbnjDouiyASHuLbIAw&ved=0CBwQ6AEwAA#v=onepage&q=skirmish%20at%20ackworth
Acworth, Georgia

Arkworth
Ackworth
Conflicts in 1864
June 1864 events
1864 in Georgia (U.S. state)
Cobb County, Georgia